Mount Lurus is a complex volcano located along the northern coast of East Java, Indonesia. The volcano has produced leucite-bearing rocks with andesitic and trachytic composition.

See also

 List of volcanoes in Indonesia

References

Volcanoes of East Java
Complex volcanoes
Pleistocene volcanoes